Damian McDonald is a contemporary Australian novelist. His novel Luck in the Greater West won the ABC Fiction Award in 2007 and was published later that year. He was a curator at the Powerhouse Museum in Sydney at the time.

References 

21st-century Australian novelists
Australian male novelists
Living people
21st-century Australian male writers
Year of birth missing (living people)